Austin James Farley (born November 10, 1993) is an American professional ice hockey player who is currently playing for HC Nové Zámky of the Slovak Extraliga. 

He formerly played in Europe with Luleå HF in the Swedish Hockey League (SHL).

Playing career 
A Chicago native, Farley played 95 games for Fargo Force of the United States Hockey League, tallying 36 goals and 36 assists. He graduated from Fargo South High School in 2012 and subsequently enrolled at the University of Minnesota-Duluth. In September 2012, he attended the CCM/USA Hockey All-American Prospects Game in Buffalo, New York. He saw the ice in 144 games over his four-year college career, with 46 goals and 60 assists, while serving as an assistant team captain his senior season.

Fresh out of college, Farley inked an amateur tryout contract with the Lake Erie Monsters of the American Hockey League (AHL) on March 30, 2016. He made his professional debut two days later against the Chicago Wolves. After being released by the Monsters, he put pen to paper on a deal with the Reading Royals of the ECHL on April 11, 2016.

Farley decided to take his game to Sweden for the 2016–17 campaign, signing with Modo Hockey of the HockeyAllsvenskan on May 18, 2016. He parted ways with Modo on November 21, 2016 by mutual consent, after having played a total of 19 games for the club with two goals and two assists, and signed with fellow HockeyAllsvenskan outfit IF Björklöven the next day.

After two productive seasons in the Allsvenskan, Farley secured a two-year contract with top tier SHL club, Luleå HF on July 3, 2018. In his debut season in the SHL in 2018–19, Farley established a depth forward role within the club, posting 5 goals and 12 points through 30 regular season games.

During his second season with Luleå in 2019–20, Farley was unable to replicate his offensive numbers, collecting 3 goals and 5 points through 22 games before he was released for personal reasons from the remainder of his contract on January 3, 2020.

Returning to North America, Farley returned to the professional ranks, agreeing to a contract for the remainder of the 2019–20 season with the Kalamazoo Wings of the ECHL on January 15, 2020. Farley instantly made his debut with the Wings assuming a top-line scoring role, recording a goal and an assist, in a 6–3 defeat to the Florida Everblades. He posted 9 goals and 22 points in 27 games before the season was cancelled due to the COVID-19 pandemic.

In the following off-season, Farley was traded by the Wings to the Kansas City Mavericks on August 12, 2020.

Career statistics

Awards and honors

References

External links

1993 births
American men's ice hockey left wingers
Ice hockey people from Chicago
IF Björklöven players
Kalamazoo Wings (ECHL) players
Kansas City Mavericks players
Lake Erie Monsters players
Living people
Luleå HF players
Minnesota Duluth Bulldogs men's ice hockey players
Modo Hockey players
Reading Royals players
HC Nové Zámky players
American expatriate ice hockey players in Sweden
American expatriate ice hockey players in Slovakia